Vladimír Dvořáček (29 October 1934 in Pardubice – 1 December 1983) was a Czech ice hockey player who competed in the 1960 Winter Olympics.

References

External links

1934 births
1983 deaths
Ice hockey players at the 1960 Winter Olympics
Olympic ice hockey players of Czechoslovakia
Sportspeople from Pardubice
Czech ice hockey goaltenders
Czechoslovak ice hockey goaltenders